Binchō-tan, also called white charcoal or binchō-zumi,  is a type of charcoal traditionally used in Japanese cooking. Its use dates to the Edo period, when, during the Genroku era, a craftsman named Bichū-ya Chōzaemon began to produce it in Tanabe, Wakayama. The typical raw material used to make binchō-tan in Japan is oak, specifically , now the official tree of Wakayama Prefecture. Wakayama continues to be a major producer of high-quality charcoal, with the town of Minabe, Wakayama, producing more binchō-tan than any other town in Japan. Binchō-tan produced in Wakayama is referred to as Kishū binchō-tan, Kishū being the old name of Wakayama.

White charcoal is made by pyrolysing wood in a kiln at approximately 240 °C for 120 hours, then raising the temperature to around 1000 °C. Once carbonised, the material is taken out and covered in a damp mixture of earth, sand and ash.

Binchō-tan is a type of hardwood charcoal which takes the natural shape of the wood that was used to make it. It is also harder than black charcoal, ringing with a metallic sound when struck. Due to its physical structure, binchō-tan takes on a whiter or even metallic appearance and, apart from being used for cooking, has other benefits such as absorption of odors.

In comparison, oga-tan is a type of biomass briquettes - a sawdust charcoal compressed into shapes with angular edges, often with a hole in the center. There exists a common misconception amongst restaurants and chefs that causes them to refer to oga-tan as binchō-tan.

Wind chimes and a musical instrument, the tankin ("charcoal-xylophone"), have been made from Binchō-tan.

References

External links

 紀州備長炭 —Making of Kishū Binchōtan by Wakayama Pref.
 炭琴 —Tankin ("charcoal-xylophone")
 "Charcoal Adds to the Good Life" – an article from 2001 touting the benefits of black and white charcoal, the latter including binchōtan

Allotropes of carbon
Fuels
Japanese cuisine
Japanese culture
Charcoal